Micah 3 is the third chapter of the Book of Micah in the Hebrew Bible or the Old Testament of the Christian Bible. This book contains the prophecies attributed to the prophet Micah, and is a part of the Book of the Twelve Minor Prophets.

Text
The original text was written in the Hebrew language. This chapter is divided into 12 verses.

Textual versions
Some early manuscripts containing the text of this chapter in Hebrew are of the Masoretic Text tradition, which includes the Codex Cairensis (895), the Petersburg Codex of the Prophets (916), Codex Leningradensis (1008).

Fragments cumulatively containing all verses of this chapter were found among the Dead Sea Scrolls, including 4Q82 (4QXIIg; 25 BCE) with extant verses 12; and Wadi Murabba'at Minor Prophets (Mur88; MurXIIProph; 75-100 CE) with extant verses 1‑12.

There is also a translation into Koine Greek known as the Septuagint, made in the last few centuries BCE. Extant ancient manuscripts of the Septuagint version include Codex Vaticanus (B; B; 4th century), Codex Alexandrinus (A; A; 5th century) and Codex Marchalianus (Q; Q; 6th century). Some fragments containing parts of this chapter in Greek were found among the Dead Sea Scrolls, that is, Naḥal Ḥever 8Ḥev1 (8ḤevXIIgr); late 1st century BCE) with extant verses 5–6.

Unjust leaders and false prophets judged (3:1–8)

Verse 2
 Who hate the good, 
 and love the evil;
who pluck off their skin from off them, 
 and their flesh from off their bones;
 "'Who hate the good, and love the evil": People love evil for its own sake after losing the sense of right and wrong.
 "Who pluck off their skin from off them": They are not shepherds, but butchers, who mercilessly extort and pillage, as also depicted in the Book of Ezekiel.
 "Pluck off their skin from off them, and their flesh from off their bones": Rob their fellow countrymen of all their substance. So the Targum, "seizing on their substance by violence, and their precious mammon they take away."

Zion's destruction (3:9–12)

Verse 12
 Therefore because of you
 Zion shall be plowed like a field,
 Jerusalem shall become heaps of ruins,
 And the mountain of the temple
 Like the bare hills of the forest.
Cros reference: Jeremiah 26:18
 "Temple": literally "house".
In the Masoretic Text there is a note in margin of this verse indicating it as the middle of the "book" (i.e., the Book of the Twelve Prophets).

See also
 Israel
 Jacob
 Zion
Related Bible parts: Psalm 14, Proverbs 30, Jeremiah 20, Jeremiah 26, Ezekiel 34, Ephesians 3

Notes

References

Sources

External links

Jewish
Micah 3 Hebrew with Parallel English
Micah 3 Hebrew with Rashi's Commentary

Christian
Micah 3 English Translation with Parallel Latin Vulgate

03